The 2022–23 season is the 125th in the history of SV Darmstadt 98 and their sixth consecutive season in the second division. The club will participate in the 2. Bundesliga and the DFB-Pokal.

Players

On loan

Pre-season and friendlies

Competitions

Overall record

2. Bundesliga

League table

Results summary

Results by round

Matches 
The league fixtures were announced on 17 June 2022.

DFB-Pokal

References

SV Darmstadt 98 seasons
Darmstadt 98